Valentine Nelson  is a Papua New Guinean footballer who plays as a defender for Lae City FC in the Papua New Guinea National Soccer League and for the national team.

References 

Living people
1987 births
Papua New Guinean footballers
Papua New Guinea international footballers
Association football defenders
2012 OFC Nations Cup players
2016 OFC Nations Cup players